YAK-Service was an airline based in Moscow, Russia. It operated executive passenger charters. It was established on 12 February 1993 and started operations on 25 November 1993. The airline was banned from operating within the EU from 24 July 2009 to November 2009, and had further restrictions imposed upon it in 2010.

On 21 September 2011, the airline had its licence revoked by Rosaviatsiya in the wake of the 2011 Lokomotiv Yaroslavl plane crash in Yaroslavl, Russia.

Fleet
The YAK-Service fleet consisted of the following aircraft:

3 Yakovlev Yak-40
1 Yakovlev Yak-42, RA-42387;

Accidents and incidents

On 7 September 2011, at 16:05 MSK, RA-42434 Yak-42D, chartered to carry the Lokomotiv Yaroslavl KHL hockey team, crashed at the Volga River bank 2 kilometres from Tunoshna Airport, Yaroslavl, Russia, and was destroyed, killing the entire team and 3 crew members, one crew member aboard survived.  Among the deceased in this crash were former National Hockey League (NHL) players Pavol Demitra, Ruslan Salei, and Kārlis Skrastiņš.

References

Sources 
 YAK-Service on Aviation Safety Network
 EUR-Lex, "Commission Regulation (EC) No 1144/2009"; EU Commission Banning Yak Service (See note 108)

Defunct airlines of Russia
Companies based in Moscow
Airlines established in 1993
Airlines disestablished in 2011
Airlines formerly banned in the European Union
1993 establishments in Russia
2011 disestablishments in Russia